Hands Up (German:Hände hoch) is a 1921 German silent film directed by Wolfgang Neff.

Cast
In alphabetical order
 Colette Corder as Harriet  
 Fritz Falkenberg as Graf Perucci  
 Sadjah Gezza as Peggy 
 Marga Köhler 
 Kurt Middendorf 
 Max Mothes as Mr. Ward  
 Ludwig Rex 
 Eduard van Meghen as Kennam

References

External links

1921 films
Films of the Weimar Republic
Films directed by Wolfgang Neff
German silent feature films
German black-and-white films